Lomatia milnerae (syn. Lomatia fraxinifolia) is a tree of the family Proteaceae native to northeastern Queensland.

References

Flora of Queensland
Plants described in 1870
fraxinifolia
Proteales of Australia
Taxa named by Ferdinand von Mueller